SS William P. Duval was a Liberty ship built in the United States during World War II. She was named after William P. Duval, the first civilian governor of the Florida Territory.

Construction 
William P. Duval was laid down on 10 August 1944, under a Maritime Commission (MARCOM) contract, MC hull 2319, by J.A. Jones Construction, Panama City, Florida; sponsored by Mary Caldwell, wife of then Florida Governor-elect, Millard Caldwell, and launched on 15 September 1944.

History
She was allocated to Blidberg & Rothchild Co. Inc., 29 September 1944. On 17 May 1946, she was laid up in the National Defense Reserve Fleet, Hudson River Reserve Fleet, Jones Point, New York.

She was allocated to the Parry Navigation Co., 15 November 1946.

She was sold, on 10 January 1947, to Società di navigazione Italia, for $563,117.54 and commercial use. She was flagged in Italy and renamed Vesuvio. She was withdrawn from the fleet on 13 January 1947. She was laid up in 1972 and scrapped in 1973.

References

Bibliography 

 
 
 
 

 

Liberty ships
Ships built in Panama City, Florida
1944 ships
Hudson River Reserve Fleet